Williams Omnibus Bus Lines was the first mass transportation system in the old City of Toronto, Ontario, Canada with four six-passenger buses. Established in 1849 by local cabinetmaker Burt Williams, it consisted of horse-drawn stagecoaches operating from the St. Lawrence Market to the Red Lion Hotel in Yorkville. The bus line was a great success, and four larger vehicles were added in 1850. After a few years, even more buses were in use, and were operating every few minutes. 
In 1861, the city gave a 30-year franchise for to Toronto Street Railways who built a horse car line, and the gauge of the buses was modified so as to fit between the tracks. The bus system lasted only until 1862, when it was bought out by the TSR. The omnibuses were manufactured by Williams' own cabinet-making store on Yonge Street, H. Burt Williams.

Prior to Williams' operations, there were a variety of stagecoach operators in the city:

 Marlborough Stage
 Rossin House Hotel - King and Wellington Streets
 Charles Thompson - Yonge Street at Elgin Mills Hotel in Richmond Hill, Ontario to St. Lawrence Market
 Barnabas Vanderburgh's Hotel in Richmond Hill, Ontario
 Eastern Mail Stage
 Rouge - Scarborough, Ontario
 Markham Village - Markham Village
 Western Mail Stage - Lambton House to Dundas
 Streetsville - now part of Mississauga
 Holland Landing - from York to Holland Landing
 Pine Grove to Weston, Ontario
 Canadian Transfer Company
 Samuel D. Purdy 1816 - founder of first stagecoach line in Upper Canada from York to Newark (Niagara-on-the-Lake)
 William Weller 1832 - from Coffin Block to Kingston, Ontario and also operated services in Cobourg, Ontario, Port Hope, Ontario, Peterborough, Ontario, Kingston-Prescott; Weller was mayor of Cobourg, Ontario
 John Playter 1828-1832 from York to Newmarket, Ontario

Fleet

See also
The companies and agencies that succeeded Williams:
 Toronto Civic Railways
 Toronto Railway Company
 Toronto Street Railways
 Toronto Transit Commission
 Toronto Transportation Commission

References
 
 

19th century in Toronto
Transport in Toronto
Intermodal transport authorities in Canada
1849 establishments in Ontario
Canadian companies established in 1849